Delamerea is a genus of flowering plants in the daisy family.

There is only one known species, Delamerea procumbens, native to Kenya and Ethiopia.

References

Monotypic Asteraceae genera
Inuleae